Dominion Stores is the primary brand name of the major-market supermarkets of Loblaw Companies Limited in the province of Newfoundland and Labrador. The Dominion brand name is used under licence from Metro Inc., which discontinued the Dominion banner in the rest of Canada in late 2008 and has no other affiliation with the Newfoundland stores.

History

The chain began as Ayre's Supermarkets, a division of local department store chain Ayre and Sons. It was acquired by Argus Corporation via Dominion Stores Ltd. in 1963, eventually adopting the Dominion brand. Following the sale of Dominion to A&P Canada, the Newfoundland operations were resold to local owners in 1987 and subsequently merged with two smaller local chains. The newly-amalgamated parent company was named Amalco Foods, but the combined chain's brand name remained "Dominion".

Loblaw acquired the Dominion chain in Newfoundland in 1995, and soon after began implementing its own private-label products and store designs at these locations. Ultimately Dominion's traditional "Big D" logo was replaced with a derivative of the Loblaws logo, rotated to look like a D instead of an L. Renovated Dominion stores have changed the orientation of the logo to match the Loblaws logo, but Loblaws stated that it would continue to use the Dominion brand in the region.

Today

In all respects other than name, the majority of Dominion stores in Newfoundland operate with the same appearance and format as the company's flagship Loblaws and Atlantic Superstore supermarkets, and its newest St. John's area locations are similar in format to the Loblaw-owned Real Canadian Superstore. Since 2002, these locations have in fact been operated as part of the Atlantic Superstore unit, with nearly identical advertising campaigns, including the "Prices you can trust" slogan used by both Atlantic Superstore and Real Canadian Superstore. Nonetheless, Loblaw has not indicated any plans to discontinue its use of the Dominion banner.

The chain has relocated or consolidated a number of locations into the "market" or superstore formats. Whereas there were roughly six locations in the early 2000s in St. John's proper (and many more in years past), there are now only three Dominion stores in the city, none built before 2000. This transition culminated with the opening of a Dominion on the site of the former Memorial Stadium in St. John's in 2007. Coincident with that opening, two medium-size locations in the east end of St. John's (older General Supermarket locations acquired in the early 1990s) were closed, while a third (Churchill Square) was converted to a SaveEasy. As a result, it is believed that all Dominion stores in the province have now been transitioned to the newer formats. Since then, SaveEasy in Churchill Square has now closed and the building is vacant. Most of the previous Newfoundland Drive / Torbay Road location is now occupied by a Coleman’s store, with a Bank of Montreal branch occupying the remaining space.

In 2018, ten Dominion stores across the province were selected by the Newfoundland and Labrador Liquor Corporation to operate licensed cannabis retail outlets.

See also 
List of supermarkets
Loblaws

References

External links
Official website

Loblaw Companies
Retail companies established in 1963
Supermarkets of Canada
Food and drink in Newfoundland and Labrador
Companies based in Newfoundland and Labrador